Jas Waters (October 21, 1980 – June 9, 2020), also known as Jas Fly,  was an American screenwriter and journalist. She was a staff writer for the television series This Is Us and also wrote for The Breaks, Hood Adjacent with James Davis, and Kidding. Waters was a journalist in the hip hop industry, writing a digital column for Vibe Vixen in the early 2010s and starring in the reality show The Gossip Game. She advocated for the importance of black writers in the film and television industry. Waters was born in Evanston, Illinois, and raised by her grandmother in a senior home. After graduating from Evanston Township High School, she attended Columbia College Chicago. She died of suicide by hanging on June 9, 2020, in Los Angeles County, California.

References

External links
 
 The Brillant Idiots – Men Too Feat. Jas Waters (Podcast)

1980 births
2020 deaths
2020 suicides
21st-century American women writers
Screenwriters from Illinois
American women television writers
African-American screenwriters
Columbia College Chicago alumni
Screenwriters from California
Writers from Evanston, Illinois
African-American women journalists
African-American journalists
Journalists from California
Journalists from Illinois
21st-century American journalists
Hip hop people
Suicides by hanging in California
Evanston Township High School alumni
21st-century American screenwriters
21st-century African-American women
21st-century African-American people
20th-century African-American people
20th-century African-American women